SS John H. McIntosh was a Liberty ship built in the United States during World War II. She was named after John H. McIntosh, an American college football player and coach, as well as an attorney and newspaper editor. He was the head coach of the Colorado State (1904–1905) and Montana State (1908–1910) football programs.

Construction
John H. McIntosh was laid down on 16 August 1944, under a Maritime Commission (MARCOM) contract, MC hull 2496, by the St. Johns River Shipbuilding Company, Jacksonville, Florida; she was sponsored by Mrs. D.M. Barnett, the wife of the executive vice president of Barnett National Bank, Jacksonville, and was launched on 23 September 1944.

History
She was allocated to the Stockard Steamship Corp., on 30 September 1944. On 2 June 1948, she was laid up in the National Defense Reserve Fleet, Wilmington, North Carolina. On 18 April 1952, she was laid up in the Hudson River Reserve Fleet, Jones Point, New York. On 13 July 1953, she was withdrawn from the fleet to be loaded with grain under the "Grain Program 1953", she returned loaded on 22 July 1953. On 27 June 1956, she was withdrawn to be unload, she returned refilled under the "Grain Program 1956" on 13 July 1956. On 9 July 1963, she was withdrawn from the fleet to be unloaded, she returned empty on 15 July 1963. She was sold for scrapping, 8 September 1970, to Eckhardt & Co., Gmbh., for $90,500. She was removed from the fleet on 16 September 1970.

References

Bibliography

 
 
 
 

 

Liberty ships
Ships built in Jacksonville, Florida
1944 ships
Wilmington Reserve Fleet
Hudson River Reserve Fleet
Hudson River Reserve Fleet Grain Program